Hase Station may refer to either of the following railway stations in Japan:
 Hase Station (Kanagawa) on the Enoshima Electric Railway
 Hase Station (Hyōgo) on the Bantan Line